Mauldin can refer to:

People
 Bill Mauldin, editorial cartoonist
 Greg Mauldin, ice hockey player
 Joe B. Mauldin, bass guitarist
 Bessie Lee Mauldin, double bass player and Blue Grass Boy

 Lorenzo Mauldin, American football player
 Michael Mauldin (producer), former president of Columbia Records and father of Jermaine Dupri
 Michael Loren Mauldin, founder of Lycos search engine
 William L. Mauldin, a South Carolina politician and railroad executive

Places
 Mauldin, Arkansas
 Mauldin, South Carolina
 Mauldin High School

Other 
Mauldin v. Wal-Mart Stores, Inc., class action lawsuit
Hryniak v Mauldin, a leading Supreme Court of Canada case on when summary judgements are appropriate